Saint-Romans is a commune in the Isère department in southeastern France.

Population

Twin towns
Saint-Romans is twinned with:

  Roccasecca dei Volsci, Italy, since 2003

See also
Communes of the Isère department
Parc naturel régional du Vercors

References

Communes of Isère
Isère communes articles needing translation from French Wikipedia